Kuwait competed at the 1972 Summer Olympics in Munich, West Germany.

Results by event

Athletics
Men's 100 metres
Younis Rabee
 First Heat — 11.20s (→ did not advance)

Men's 4 × 100 m Relay
Abdulazeez Abdulkareem, Malik Murdhi, Mohammad Mobarak, and Younis Rabee 
 Heat — DNS (→ did not advance)

Swimming
Men's 100m Freestyle
Abdalla Zeyab
 Heat — 1:03.94 (→  did not advance)

Men's 200m Freestyle
Fawzi Irhama
 Heat — 2:33.75 (→  did not advance)

References
Official Olympic Reports

Nations at the 1972 Summer Olympics
1972
Summer Olympics